Persatuan Sepakbola Indonesia Takengon Sekitarnya (simply known as Persitas Takengon) is an Indonesian football club based in Takengon, Central Aceh Regency, Aceh. They currently compete in the Liga 3 and their homeground is Musara Alun Stadium.

References

External links 
Persitas Takengon Instagram

Football clubs in Indonesia
Football clubs in Aceh
Football in Indonesia